Hervé Banti (born March 26, 1977) is a Monégasque-national Olympic triathlete, who competes on pro team AS Monaco Triathlon. Banti competed in the 2012 Summer Olympics Men's Triathlon, placing 49th overall.

Olympic results

References

External links
Official Website

1977 births
Living people
Monegasque male triathletes
Olympic triathletes of Monaco
Triathletes at the 2012 Summer Olympics